General elections were held in Belgium on 16 November 1919. Although the Belgian Labour Party received the most votes in the Chamber of Representatives elections, the Catholic Party remained the largest party in both the Chamber and the Senate. Voter turnout was 88.5% in the Chamber elections.

They were the first elections after the First World War, and the first with universal single-vote suffrage (for men), a change that was sought by and benefited the Belgian Labour Party. The voting age was also lowered from 25 to 21, and the system of proportional representation was modified to use apparentment (combining votes of different arrondissements within a province).

Results

Chamber of Representatives

Senate

Constituencies
The distribution of seats among the electoral districts was as follows:

Notes

References

Belgium
1910s elections in Belgium
General
Belgium